Saint Gerard Majella can refer to

People
 Gerard Majella (1726–1755), an Italian lay brother of the Redemptorists, who is honored as a saint by the Catholic Church

Places
Saint-Gérard-Majella, Quebec, a parish municipality  in the Pierre-De Saurel Regional County Municipality of Quebec
Saint-Gérard-Majella, Lanaudière, Quebec, a former municipality in Lanaudière, Quebec, now part of L'Assomption

Churches
Basilica of St. Gerard Majella, a Roman Catholic church in Curvelo, Minas Gerais, Brazil
Shrine and Basilica of San Gerardo Maiella, a Roman Catholic church in Materdomini (Caposele), Province of Avellino, Campania, Italy
St Gerard's Church and Monastery, buildings in  Wellington, New Zealand
St. Gerard Majella (church), a church in Rome
St. Gerard Majella Catholic Church, part of the Catholic Parish of Epping and Carlingford in England

Events
St. Gerard Majella Annual Novena held each October at St. Joseph's Redemptorist Church, Dundalk, Ireland